American Chai is a 2001 comedy-drama film written and directed by Indian American director Anurag Mehta. His brother, Aalok Mehta, played the starring role opposite Sheetal Sheth, who had previously starred in the similar genre film ABCD. The film also had a minor role played by Paresh Rawal.

The film deals with an Indian American student who wants to pursue his love of music over the more "typical" academic endeavors of Indian Americans (e.g., medicine, engineering, and law).

The film won the Audience Award at the 2001 Slamdance Film Festival, with the New York Post describing it as a "slight but sweet film".

Premise

Sureel is a first generation Indian American college graduating senior music major whose controlling father still believes that he is pre-med. His desires in life conflict with both his family's traditional values, and the usual Indian way of assimilating into the United States by becoming a doctor or engineer. As graduation approaches, he has an opportunity to be nationally recognized for his music which will simplify telling his father the truth.

Cast

Aalok Mehta – Sureel
Sheetal Sheth – Maya
Aasif Mandvi – Engineering Sam
Josh Ackrman – Toby
Ajay Naidu – Hari
Paresh Rawal -	Sureel's Dad
Bharti Desai -	Sureel's Mom
Akshay Oberoi – Neel
Rajiv Reddy – Young Sureel
Jamie Hurley -	Jen
Reena Shah – Sejal
Anand Chulani – Raju
Jill Anderson – Lisa
Kyle Koehl – Young Boy
Marlee Kattler – Young Girl

The Philadelphia-based hip-hop band Fathead also appears in the film.

References

External links

 

2001 films
2001 comedy-drama films
Films about Indian Americans
2000s English-language films
Films by Desi directors
2001 directorial debut films
Comedy-drama films about Asian Americans
2000s American films